Loughguile, also spelt Loughgiel or Loughgeel, is a village and civil parish in County Antrim, Northern Ireland. Situated 8 miles east of Ballymoney it is within the Causeway Coast and Glens Council area, and is at the edge of the Glens of Antrim. It had a population of 396 people (128 households) in the 2011 Census.

Education
The local schools are St Patrick's Primary School and St Anne's Primary School.

Sport

The hurling team, Loughgiel Shamrocks, is the only team in Ulster to have won the All-Ireland Senior Club Hurling Championship, doing so in 1983 and 2012.  The club also currently has the highest number of county titles in Antrim (20).

People

 George Macartney, 1st Earl Macartney (14 May 1737 – 31 May 1806), British statesman, colonial administrator and diplomat. 
 Henry Henry (1846–1908), Bishop of Down and Connor, was from Loughguile.
 Cahal Daly (1917–2009), Lord Primate of All Ireland and Archbishop of Armagh, was a native of the parish. Daly had previously served as Bishop of Down and Connor.

See also
List of civil parishes of County Antrim
List of towns and villages in Northern Ireland

References

External links

Villages in County Antrim
Civil parishes of County Antrim